Anthony Arthur Spink (16 November 1929 – 7 February  2011) was an English footballer who played as a centre forward. He was born in Doncaster and played professionally for Sheffield Wednesday, Chester, Workington, Sunderland and Tranmere Rovers between 1949 and 1957, making a total of 20 Football League appearances.

After retiring from football, Spink became the proprietor of an estate agency in East Sussex.

References

External links
Tony Spink at margatefootballclubhistory.com

1929 births
2011 deaths
Footballers from Doncaster
English footballers
Association football forwards
Margate F.C. players
Sheffield Wednesday F.C. players
Chester City F.C. players
Workington A.F.C. players
Sunderland A.F.C. players
Tranmere Rovers F.C. players
Weymouth F.C. players